McHenry Venaani (born 8 September 1977) is a Namibian politician and the president of the Popular Democratic Movement, a party with sixteen seats in the National Assembly of Namibia and one seat in the National Council of Namibia. Venaani has been a member of the National Assembly from 2002 to 2010, in 2014, and since 2015. At the time of his appointment in 2002, he was Namibia's youngest MP. He is one of the three candidates to voted as Paramount Chief of the Ovaherero Traditional Authority in January 2023, competing Hoze Riruako and Mike Kavekotora.

Education
Born in Windhoek, Namibia, Venaani matriculated in 1995 at Dawid Bezuidenhout High School in Khomasdal, Windhoek. He holds a Diploma in International Trade law, Holborn College, UK (2002); Diploma in Constitutional Law, Holborn College, UK (1999). Diploma in Business Law, Classic College (1997).

In 2018 Venaani announced that the Commonwealth University in London, England, had awarded a doctor of laws (LL.D.) honoris causa to him "for his service, selflessness and other outstanding contributions as Namibia's leader of the official opposition in parliament". Within days, the honorary doctorate, the institution conferring it, and the professor awarding the degree, were all exposed to be fake. Frederico Links, researcher at the Namibian Institute for Public Policy Research, subsequently questioned Venaani's "political ethics [...] wisdom and maturity".

Career
Considered a rising star in the Democratic Turnhalle Alliance (DTA), Venaani ran for the top position in the party in 2005 against Katuutire Kaura. In that election, Venaani lost and also lost his position as party secretary general. In November 2008, Venaani retook his position as secretary general, beating Alois Gende by a margin of 111 to 35 in party elections.

Venaani was placed on DTA's electoral list prior to the 2009 general election, but the party did not receive enough votes for his re-election. In the 2013 DTA elective central committee meeting, Venaani defeated Kaura by a margin of 96 to 52 and assumed the party presidency. When Kaura was expelled from the DTA in February 2014, Venaani also took over his seat in Parliament, but a court case brought by Kaura days after the decision was not contested by the DTA, and Kaura was reinstated both as parliamentarian and party member. Venaani re-entered parliament in March 2015 after the 2014 election as top-placed member of the DTA.

On 4 November 2017, days after its 40th anniversary, the DTA was renamed the Popular Democratic Movement at Venaani's suggestion. This was done to facilitate modernisation of the party, and to shed its "colonial" name.

In the 2019 Namibian general election Venaani ran as presidential candidate of the strongest opposition party. He gathered a disappointing 5.3% of the popular vote, coming in as distant third behind Hage Geingob and Panduleni Itula. His party, however, achieved a very strong result and gained 16 seats in the National Assembly, up 11 from the previous election.

Personal life
He has been married to Cloudina Venaani since 2005 and has two children. Cloudina is a Social Scientist who has worked for the United Nations and now responsible for the Global Fund-supported program on adolescent girls and young women (AGYW).

References

1977 births
Living people
Politicians from Windhoek
Members of the National Assembly (Namibia)
Popular Democratic Movement politicians
Alumni of the University of Wolverhampton
Candidates for President of Namibia